Jaak Van Driessche (born 3 July 1969) is a Belgian rower. He competed at the 1992 Summer Olympics and the 1996 Summer Olympics.

References

1969 births
Living people
Belgian male rowers
Olympic rowers of Belgium
Rowers at the 1992 Summer Olympics
Rowers at the 1996 Summer Olympics
Rowers from Ghent